Hans-Peter Tschudi (22 October 1913 – 30 September 2002) was a Swiss politician and member of the Swiss Federal Council (1959–1973) heading the Department of Home Affairs (Swiss interior minister).

Tschudi was a member of the Cantonal Government of Basel-City from 1953 to 1959. He was affiliated to the Social Democratic Party. From 1956, he represented the canton of Basel-City in the Swiss Council of States, until he was elected to the Federal Council of Switzerland on 17 December 1959.

During his time in office he held the Department of Home Affairs and was President of the Confederation twice in 1965 and 1970. Tschudi handed over office on 31 December 1973. In his position as the head of the Department of Home Affairs, he promoted the expansion of social security during the economic boom years.

References

External links

Hans-Peter Tschudi in History of Social Security in Switzerland
Personal archives at Staatsarchiv des Kantons Basel-Stadt

1913 births
2002 deaths
Politicians from Basel-Stadt
Swiss nobility
Swiss Calvinist and Reformed Christians
Social Democratic Party of Switzerland politicians
Members of the Federal Council (Switzerland)
Members of the Council of States (Switzerland)
University of Basel alumni
University of Paris alumni